KRKU (106.5 FM) was a radio station with an FCC-issued license to cover to serve Wheatland, Wyoming, United States. The station was owned by Lorenz E. Proietti.

History
This station received its original construction permit from the Federal Communications Commission on December 29, 2006. The new station was assigned the call sign KKHI by the FCC on February 7, 2008. On July 3, 2008, the station changed its call sign to KMQS. The station's revised construction permit was scheduled to expire on December 29, 2009. The station's license to cover was issued on December 30, 2009.

On June 21, 2012, the station changed its call sign to the current KRKU.

On February 24, 2014, KRKU's owner surrendered the station's license to the FCC, who subsequently cancelled the license on February 26, 2014.

References

External links

RKU
Radio stations established in 2009
Defunct radio stations in the United States
Radio stations disestablished in 2014
2009 establishments in Wyoming
2014 disestablishments in Wyoming
RKU